Cinnamodendron cubense is a species of flowering plant in the family Canellaceae. It is a rare species endemic to Cuba.

References 
	

cubense
Endemic flora of Cuba
Plants described in 1922